{{DISPLAYTITLE:C4H11NO}}
The molecular formula C4H11NO (molar mass: 89.14 g/mol, exact mass: 89.08406 u) may refer to:

 Aminomethyl propanol
 Diethylhydroxylamine (DEHA)
 Dimethylethanolamine (DMAE or DMEA)

Molecular formulas